The Ambassador from the United Kingdom to Iraq is the United Kingdom's foremost diplomatic representative in Iraq, and head of the UK's diplomatic mission in Iraq.  The official title is His Britannic Majesty's Ambassador to the Republic of Iraq.

List of heads of mission

High Commissioner for Iraq (and Commander-in-Chief, from 1922) 
1920–1923: Sir Percy Cox
1923–1929: Sir Henry Dobbs
1929–1932: Sir Francis Humphrys

Ambassador Extraordinary and Plenipotentiary to His Majesty the King of Iraq
1932–1935: Sir Francis Humphrys
1935–1937: Sir Archibald Clark Kerr
1937–1939: Sir Maurice Peterson
1939–1941: Sir Basil Newton
1941–1945: Sir Kinahan Cornwallis 
1945–1948: Sir Hugh Stonehewer-Bird 
1948–1951: Sir Henry Mack
1951–1954: Sir John Troutbeck
1954–1958: Sir Michael Wright

Ambassador Extraordinary and Plenipotentiary to the Republic of Iraq
1958–1961: Sir Humphrey Trevelyan
1961–1965: Sir Roger Allen
1965–1967: Sir Richard Beaumont
1967–1968:  Break in diplomatic relations due to the Six-Day War
1968–1969: Trefor Evans
1969–1971: Glencairn Balfour Paul
1971–1974: Break in diplomatic relations following Iran's seizure of the Tunb islands
1974–1977: John Graham
1977–1980: Alexander Stirling
1980–1982: Stephen Egerton
1982–1985: Sir John Moberly
1985–1989: Terence Clark
1990–1991: Sir Harold Walker
1991–2004: Break in diplomatic relations following the First Gulf War
2004–2005: Edward Chaplin
2005–2006: William Patey
2006–2007: Dominic Asquith
2007–2009: Christopher Prentice
2009–2011: John Jenkins
2011–2012: Michael Aron
2012–2014: Simon Paul Collis
2014–2017: Frank Baker
2017–2019: Jonathan Wilks

2019–: Stephen Hickey

References

See also
British-Iraqi relations

External links
Iraq and the UK , gov.uk

Iraq
 
United Kingdom